The Călui is a right tributary of the river Olteț in Romania. It discharges into the Olteț near Oboga.

References

Rivers of Romania
Rivers of Olt County